Raphaël Bouton (born December 14, 1969), is a French politician, who was born deaf. He is the first deaf president of deaf and hard of hearing socialists. He is founder of the section deaf and hard of hearing socialists (Section des sourds et malentendants socialistes - SSMS) created 19 June 2010.

He was a member of the Disability Committee of the Parti Socialiste and leader of the Rosny Sous Bois section of the party.

Career 
He was one of the co-founders of the first French association of deaf students (association des étudiants sourds et malentendants- AESM) with Laurence Braun Medina, Laurence Leschi from October 1989 to July 1992. He assumed the office of vice-president and president of this Association, now disappeared.

He was Secretary and Vice-President of the Socio-cultural Association of the Deaf in Alsace (Association Socioculturelle des Sourds d'Alsace – ASSA) from 1999 to 2002. This association, which merged with the Alsatian School of French Sign Language (École Alsacienne de la Langue des signes françaises – EALSF), it is now called the Union of the Deaf and Hard of Hearing of the Lower Rhine (Union des Sourds et Malentendants du Bas-Rhin – USM67). He has contributed to the merger and the birth of USM67.

He was a member of the French Association for Information and Defense deaf speakers (Association Française pour l’Information et la Défense des sourds s’Exprimant Oralement – AFIDEO) from January 2003 to October 2008. He was one of the vice presidents and assured the responsibility of various commissions.

He was the spokesman for the militant group of deaf hearing socialist which was formed on Nov. 26 2006. This group has been active in the French presidential campaign and made accessible to the presidential program of Ségolène Royal in 2006-2007. This group has created section deaf and hard of hearing socialists (Section des sourds et malentendants socialistes - SSMS).
He was re-elected as president, unanimously at the SSMS's General Meeting of 24 November 2012.

He ran on the candidate list of the Parti Socialiste in Mayor-elect, of Philippe Vachieri 2008 in Rosny Sous Bois.

He was the first deaf man to be the campaign manager of a candidate in France.

He was run as substitute deputy in the legislative elections in 2012 along with Elisabeth Pochon, in the 8th District of the Seine-Saint-Denis. It is also the first deaf man to run for parliamentary elections in France. He was elected on 17 June 2012, with Elisabeth Pochon.

In 2015, he is on the regional list in Ile de France with Claude Bartolone in 19th position.

References

External links 

  his official site
  old site of group of deaf and heard of hearing socialists
  Section des sourds et malentendants socialistes : official site
  Le Figaro : le Parti Socialiste dispose d'une brigade de choc (the Parti Pocialiste has a shock brigade)
  Yanous, French site of disability
  Historical : Deafness et Socialism
  The Political Summer University which open for disability people.

Living people
1969 births

Deaf politicians
French politicians
French deaf people
Deaf culture